Samuel Meredith (1741 – February 10, 1817) was an American merchant from Philadelphia, Pennsylvania. He was a delegate for Pennsylvania to the Continental Congress from 1786 to 1788. President Washington appointed him Treasurer of the United States, and he held this office from 1789 until his retirement on December 1, 1801.

He was born in Philadelphia to Reese and Martha (Carpenter) Meredith. His father was a prominent local merchant, and after attending Dr. Allison's Academy, he joined the family business. Samuel would later expand the business in partnership with his brother-in-law George Clymer, who married his sister Elizabeth Meredith in 1765. Samuel married Margaret Cadwalader on May 19, 1772. He lived his later life in Northeastern Pennsylvania. He spent time in Carbondale Township in Lackawanna County, Pennsylvania, where the local fire department bears his name. He died near Pleasant Mount in Wayne County, Pennsylvania, where he is interred in a private cemetery.

References

External links
biographic sketch at U.S. Congress website

1741 births
1817 deaths
Continental Congressmen from Pennsylvania
18th-century American politicians
Treasurers of the United States
American people of Welsh descent
Politicians from Philadelphia
People of colonial Pennsylvania
Colonial American merchants
Burials in Pennsylvania